Asmara Brewery FC or Asmara Birra is an Eritrean football club based in Asmara and founded in 1944 (with the original 1936 name GS Melotti). It is linked and economically maintained by the Asmara Brewery.

History

The Asmara Birra plays in the Eritrean Premier League since the 1990s. 
 
The team was initially founded in 1944 with the name Asmara Birra by the engineer Melotti, who founded the "Asmara Brewery" under the name of GS Hamasien (he had already founded in 1936 the GS Melotti, an amateur football team in Italian Asmara).
 
In 2008, the club won the Eritrea championship.

Achievements
Eritrean Premier League: 1
2008

Performance in CAF competitions
CAF Cup: 1 appearance
1998 – Preliminary Round

Current squad

See also
 Asmara Brewery
 Football in Eritrea

References

Football clubs in Eritrea
Organisations based in Asmara
Works association football teams
1944 establishments